The Dr. Toler R. White House is at 509 Spring Street, Kingman, Arizona. The house was built in 1916. The house is a bungalow/Craftsman style. Dr. White came to town in 1910 or so, after working in the mining and reservations doctor. He lived here until his death in 1945. The home is on the National Register of Historical Places, and its reference number is 86001176.

It was evaluated for National Register listing as part of a 1985 study of 63 historic resources in Kingman that led to this and many others being listed.

References

American Craftsman architecture in Arizona
Houses on the National Register of Historic Places in Arizona
Houses completed in 1916
Houses in Kingman, Arizona
National Register of Historic Places in Kingman, Arizona